Sofie Formica (born 29 June 1971 Brisbane, Queensland, Australia) is an Australian radio and television presenter best known for hosting Queensland-based lifestyle show The Great South East on the Seven Network from 1997 until 2016. Afternoons with Sofie Formica was launched on Brisbane radio station 4BC in October 2021.

Career

Hosting

Formica's television career commenced at age 14 on local Queensland school TV programs. In 1990, Sofie joined the cast of the award winning Seven Network children's show Wombat, however the show was axed that same year. Formica then hosted two children's programs: the Saturday morning program Saturday Disney (1990–1992) and the weekday program Now You See It (1990–1993) based on the US format Now You See It. In hosting Now You See It, she became the first female game show host on Australian television.

The older audience pegged her as a presenter of several shows. She was host of the comedy TV series Just Kidding (from 1992 until 1995), and she was an original member of The Great Outdoors. She was also a reporter on Extra.

Actress
Formica appeared in several guest roles in TV serials, including featuring in Home and Away as the character Imogen Miller, cast in 10 episodes between 1992 and 1993.

Formica guest-starred on the American TV series Murder, She Wrote, Season 12, Episode 20, titled "Southern Double-Cross" as the character Linda Molen; at that time, she also hosted technology-based programming in San Francisco for CNET during its Sunday morning run on USA Network in the mid-to-late '90s. She has had minor roles in the movies First Strike (1996) and San Andreas (2015).

Personal life
On 31 December 1994, Sofie married Scott Wilkie. They live in the Brisbane suburb of St Lucia and have three children.

References

External links
 

Living people
1971 births
Actresses from Brisbane
Australian television presenters
Australian television actresses
Australian women television presenters